Castrillino is a locality and minor local entity located in the municipality of Villaquilambre, in León province, Castile and León, Spain. As of 2020, it has a population of 17.

Geography 
Castrillino is located 12km northeast of León, Spain.

References

Populated places in the Province of León